Apfelstädt may refer to:

Apfelstädt (Nesse-Apfelstädt), a village in Thuringia, Germany, today part of Nesse-Apfelstädt
Apfelstädt (river), of Thuringia, Germany